Gerasimos 'Makis' Voukelatos (born 29 March 1998) is a Greek professional footballer who plays as a winger for Super League 2 club Episkopi.

References

1998 births
Living people
Greek footballers
Greece youth international footballers
Super League Greece players
Football League (Greece) players
Super League Greece 2 players
Gamma Ethniki players
Panionios F.C. players
Platanias F.C. players
Kallithea F.C. players
PAE Kerkyra players
Association football wingers
People from Cephalonia
Sportspeople from the Ionian Islands (region)